Beja Air Base, officially designated as Air Base No. 11 (BA11) is one of the most important military airbases in Portugal,  northwest of Beja,  north of Algarve. It is used by the Portuguese Air Force (PoAF) and has two parallel runways in the 01/19 direction, the biggest being . The base is home to two training squadrons, one helicopter squadron and one maritime patrol squadron.

History

The base was established on 21 October 1964, originally built to serve as a training facility for the German Air Force (Luftwaffe), due to airspace limitations within West Germany. The Luftwaffe operated from the airbase until 1993, during which period it was used particularly for weapons training. In 1987 the Portuguese Air Force's 103 Squadron using Lockheed T-33 and Northrop T-38 aircraft was relocated from Montijo. After their arrival, the base started to host a mixed array of fixed and rotary-wing trainers, as well as maritime patrol aircraft. 

Between 1993 to 2018, the PoAF has operated Dassault/Dornier Alpha Jet aircraft from the airbase, which were donated by Germany as compensation for leaving the air base in 1993.

Current state

The base is now modern and well-equipped, employing around 1,000 personnel. A third parallel runway/taxiway supports its helicopter facilities. Beja Air Base is one of the most important training facilities of the PoAF and during 2008 operated over 70,000 flying hours. The first training phase comprises flying on Socata TB 30 Epsilon aircraft, which currently has 15 operational aircraft. The 552 Squadron operates 5 AgustaWestland AW119 Koala helicopters tasked with tactical transport for the army, helicopter pilot training and search and rescue. The 601 Squadron currently uses 5 P-3C Orion Cup + aircraft which provide 24/7 search and rescue and anti-submarine warfare cover.

Construction of a civilian terminal was undertaken in 2009, with this facility being aimed at low-cost carriers.

Beja's runway is the only mainland Portugal runway capable of accommodating an Airbus A380. The Portuguese wet lease airline Hi Fly previously operated its A380, purchased second-hand in 2018, from Beja.

Tenant units
Portuguese Air Force
 101 Sqn. - TB30 Epsilon
 103 Sqn. "Caracóis" (Snails) — complementary flying training and operational transition training
 552 Sqn. "Zangões" (Drones) — tactical air transport operations and complementary flying training in helicopters
 601 Sqn. "Lobos" (Wolves) — maritime patrol squadron

Notes

References
Base Tour: Beja, Portugal - Portuguese Super Base, Air Forces Monthly magazine, March 2009 issue.

External links
Portuguese Air Force - Air Base 11, Beja 
Empresa de Desenvolvimento do Aeroporto de Beja 

Airports in Portugal
Buildings and structures in Beja, Portugal
Portuguese Air Force bases
Germany–Portugal relations
Military of Portugal
Military installations in Portugal